Heart Attack is a 1960 Australian television play written by George F. Kerr. It was recorded in Melbourne, broadcast "live" there, recorded and shown later on Sydney television. It was received with notably critical hostility.

The play was also adapted for radio with a 75-minute running time.

Plot
Dr Brian Wynter's career is threatened by a blackmailer called Pearce. Pearce learns of Wynter's affair with another woman before his marriage and threatens to tell the doctor's wife, Judith, unless he is paid. Dr Wynter pays him off but Pearce keeps asking for money. Dr Wynter decides the solution is murder.

Cast

John Morgan as Dr. Wynter
Beverley Phillips as Judith
Edward Brayshaw as Pearce
Wynn Roberts as Dr. Rutherford
Marcella Burgoyne as Clare Mackay
Bruce Archer		
Carol Armstrong		
June Brunelle		
Campbell Copelin	
Edward Howell		
Kendrick Hudson		
Carole Potter

Production
It was Edward Howell's twentieth appearance in live television drama; he had appeared in six in Sydney before moving to Melbourne to star in Black Chiffon. Howell went in for an operation shortly after taping.

Reception
The Age said it "had one of the feeblest plots ever peddled on Melbourne TV... 65 minutes of incoherent mush" and suggested the ABC "stick to imported scripts" for a while.

That paper later said it "set Australian TV playwriting back several years" and then at the end of the year called it the worst Australian drama of the year.

The critic for the Sydney Morning Herald called it a "routine medical-domestic drama... given a routine performance... the play bad a kind of tired professional finish but no real originality in its plot or its techniques"in which the leads "all acted competency but without much real conviction."

See also
 List of television plays broadcast on Australian Broadcasting Corporation (1960s)

References

External links
 

1960 television plays
Australian Broadcasting Corporation original programming
Australian live television shows
1960s Australian television plays
Black-and-white Australian television shows
English-language television shows